Pitar fulminatus, or the lightning venus clam, is a species of bivalve mollusc in the family Veneridae. It can be found along the Atlantic coast of North America, ranging from North Carolina to Brazil and Bermuda.

References

Pitar
Bivalves described in 1828